Blue Movie is a satirical novel by Terry Southern about the making of a high-budget pornographic film featuring major movie stars. In the book, a highly regarded art film director named "Boris Adrian" attempts to create such a film. Blue Movie was published in 1970. 

According to author Stephen Thrower in his book Nightmare USA, Stanley Kubrick considered adapting Blue Movie for film, but the project never materialized. All the same, the book is dedicated to Kubrick. Thrower speculates that the film-within-the-film Alex is forced to watch in Kubrick's A Clockwork Orange is the closest we'll come to a visualization of such a collaboration.

References 

1970 American novels
American satirical novels
Hollywood novels
Novels by Terry Southern
World Publishing Company books